Nickerson Farms was an American roadside restaurant franchise that existed between the mid-1960s and the early 1980s. It was started by I. J. Nickerson, a former Stuckey's franchisee who did not agree with that chain's rules and regulations. Nickerson Farms had as many as sixty restaurants located along Interstate highways, mainly in the Midwestern United States. Each Nickerson Farms location had a full-room restaurant, with a gift shop. Honey, collected from on-site beehives, could also be purchased at Nickerson Farms stores.

The majority of Nickerson Farms locations sold Skelly gasoline and other petroleum products.

See also
Stuckey's
Horne's

References

Regional restaurant chains in the United States
Defunct restaurant chains in the United States